Raja Eleena binti Almarhum Sultan Azlan Muhibbuddin Shah Al-Maghfur-lah (born 3 April 1960) is the fourth child of the Sultan of Perak, Sultan Azlan Shah.

She was born on 3 April 1960 and during her school years, she went to SMK Convent Bukit Nanas. She also holds a bachelor's degree in Law from the University of London. Yang Amat Mulia is a lawyer with her own legal firm in Kuala Lumpur.

Biography 
Raja Eleena is also a practising barrister, being called by Lincoln's Inn, London, in 1985.

Upon returning to Malaysia, she joined Messrs Skrine & Co and was called to the Malaysian Bar in 1986. She set up her own legal practice Messrs Raja Eleena, Siew Ang & Associates in 1987, of which she is a senior partner.

Raja Eleena was appointed to the Board of Gamuda on 1 June 1992.

She is the niece of Kamarul Zaman bin Mohd Ali. She is a director and major shareholder of Generasi Setia (M) Sdn Bhd, which is a major shareholder of Gamuda.

Her directorships in other public companies are with KAF-Seagroatt & Campbell Holdings Berhad and Danau Permai Resort Berhad.

Raja Eleena was named in May 2007 as Malaysia's 25th richest in the country with assets worth over US$228 million (MYR 773 million). She becomes the list’s second woman after Chong Chook Yew, who occupies number 18th with US$320 million (MYR 1.085 billion).

Childhood 
Raja Eleena was born at Penang, Malaya, 3 April 1960 as the fourth child of the late Sultan Azlan Muhibbuddin Shah ibni Almarhum Sultan Yussuff Izzuddin Shah Ghafarullahu-lah, later Sultan Azlan Shah of Perak, and his wife Tuanku Bainun Binti Mohd Ali (herself a member of the Royal House of Perak and much fourth granddaughter of her husband's father Sultan Yussuff Izzuddin Shah of Perak)

Her siblings are :
 brother Raja Nazrin Shah (born 27 November 1956)
 sister Raja Azureen (born 9 December 1957)
 brother Raja Ashman Shah (born 28 December 1958 died 30 March 2012)
 sister Raja Yong Sofia (born 24 June 1961)

Honours

Honours of Raja Eleena 
She has been awarded:

Honours of Perak 
  Member Second Class of the Azlan Royal Family Order (DKA II)
  Grand Knight of the Order of Cura Si Manja Kini (the Perak Sword of State, SPCM, 19 April 1989) with title Dato' Seri 
 current ribbon de the decoration :

Honours of Ismail Farouk 
He has been awarded:

Honours of Perak 
  Member Second Class of the Azlan Royal Family Order (DKA II)
  Grand Knight of the Order of Cura Si Manja Kini (the Perak Sword of State, SPCM, 19 April 1992) with title Dato' Seri 
 current ribbon of the decoration :

References

Ancestry

Royal House of Perak
1960 births
People from Penang
Living people
Malaysian people of Malay descent
Malaysian Muslims
Daughters of monarchs
20th-century Malaysian lawyers

Members of Lincoln's Inn
21st-century Malaysian lawyers